Calopsocidae is a former family of Psocodea (formerly Psocoptera) (book lice) belonging to the suborder Psocomorpha. This family is now considered to be a junior synonym of Pseudocaeciliidae.

Members of the family often have a reticulate venation and coriaceous wings, and a head with a sharp vertex, and they are especially diverse in New Guinea.

See also 
 Insect wing 
 Comstock-Needham system

Sources 

 Lienhard, C. & Smithers, C. N. 2002. Psocoptera (Insecta): World Catalogue and Bibliography. Instrumenta Biodiversitatis, vol. 5. Muséum d'histoire naturelle, Genève.

Psocoptera families
Psocomorpha